Dun Evan or the Doune of Cawdor is a hill fort located  south west of Cawdor in the Highland area of Scotland. The site has a wide view in all directions, extending to the mouth of the River Nairn at the town of Nairn, 7 miles to the north east on the shore of the Moray Firth. Dun Evan is scheduled by Historic Environment Scotland as a site of national importance.

Facing stones and traces of vitrification were recorded from this wall in 1963 and a dip in the wall in the north east suggests it was the entrance to the enclosure. A wall enclosing a smaller area of the summit marks a second phase of the defences, probably built with stones removed from the fortifications of the earlier phase. The small size of the stones of the inner walls of the fort suggest that they were timber-laced.

The fort is surrounded by a series of outer defences further down the flanks of the rock, including a  arc of ruined walling and earthworks to the south west, and a similar  arc to the north east.

References

Hill forts in Scotland
Vitrified forts in Scotland
Archaeological sites in Highland (council area)
Scheduled monuments in Scotland